Kenneth Edwin Goodlet (11 October 1921- 15 November 2006) was an Australian actor with extensive credits in film, radio, TV and theatre, known for Ned Kelly (1970), Bluey (1976) and The Long Arm (1970).

Select Credits
One Morning Near Troodos (1958)
Till Death Do Us Part (1959)
A Dead Secret (1959)
Antony and Cleopatra (1959)
Black Limelight (1959)
Ned Kelly (1959)
The Square Ring (1960)
Macbeth (1960)
Long Distance (1961)
Quiet Night (1961)
The Big Deal (1961)
Call Me a Liar (1961)
The Hobby Horse (1962)
The Patriots (1962)
The Criminals (1962)
The Music Upstairs (1962)
The Coastwatchers (1962)
Light Me a Lucifer (1962)
Calamity the Cow (1967)

References

External links
Kenneth Goodlet at IMDb
Kenneth Goodlet at Ausstage

Australian actors
1921 births
2006 deaths